William Roberts (born December 29, 1946) is an American politician in the state of Alabama. He served in the Alabama House of Representatives from 2010 to 2014. He was the Assistant State Commissioner of Labor in Alabama from 1972 to 1976. He ran unsuccessfully for the Alabama Senate District 32 in 2018.

References

Living people
1946 births
People from Jasper, Alabama
University of Alabama alumni
Republican Party members of the Alabama House of Representatives